Aden is a locality in the County of Forty Mile No. 8, Alberta. It serves as a port of entry into the U.S. state of Montana for the nearby Canada – United States border crossing. The port of entry is located where Alberta Highway 880 continues as Secondary Highway 409 within Liberty County, Montana.

The locality takes its name from Aden, a port city in Yemen.

Climate 
Aden experiences a humid continental climate (Köppen climate classification Dfb) that just barely falls short of being a semi-arid climate (Köppen BSk). Winters are long and dry, but only mildly cold, while summers are short but very warm. Precipitation is low, with an annual average of 407 mm, and is concentrated in the warmer months.

References 

Alberta land ports of entry
Localities in the County of Forty Mile No. 8